Alexandra Bezeková (born 13 August 1992) is a Slovak sprinter. She competed in the 100 metres at the 2016 European Athletics Championships.

International competitions

Personal bests
Outdoor
100 metres – 11.87 (-0.4 m/s, Zürich 2014)
200 metres – 23.55 (-0.4 m/s, Ostrava 2016)
400 metres – 54.65	 (Banská Bystrica 2016)
Indoor
60 metres – 7.47 (Prague 2015)
200 metres – 23.64	 (Ostrava 2016)
400 metres – 55.81	 (Prague 2015)

References

External links

1992 births
Living people
Slovak female sprinters
Athletes (track and field) at the 2015 European Games
Sportspeople from Košice
European Games silver medalists for Slovakia
European Games medalists in athletics
Competitors at the 2015 Summer Universiade
Competitors at the 2017 Summer Universiade